Fossé is a commune in Ardennes, France. The French Egyptologist Adolphe Reinach was killed in Fossé in the first month of the First World War.

Population

See also
Communes of the Ardennes department

References

Communes of Ardennes (department)
Ardennes communes articles needing translation from French Wikipedia